The April 2010 Yangon Thingyan bombings were bomb blasts that had killed 10 people and injured 178 on 15 April 2010, in Yangon, Myanmar (Burma) during the Thingyan Water Festival.

Background
Bombings inside or in the vicinity of Yangon have occurred on numerous occasions in the past. In April 2006, five bombs detonated in the centre of the city, no casualties were reported. In September 2008, a bomb exploded outside the Yangon City Hall killing 7 people and injured several others.

Bombings
On 15 April 2010, three separate blasts occurred in front of the X2O water festival pavilion allegedly sponsored by Than Shwe's grandson near to Kandawgyi Lake, where hundreds of people were celebrating Water Festival.

Investigations
Police Chief Khin Yi said that three members of Vigorous Burmese Student Warriors were responsible for the bomb blasts.

Phyo Wai Aung, an engineer, was charged with alleged involvement in bombing was sentenced to death in May 2012. He pleaded innocent to the charges and said he was tortured during interrogations. He was released under a presidential pardon in August 2012 and died of liver cancer in January 2013.

References

Attacks in Asia in 2010
2010 in Myanmar
Mass murder in 2010
Terrorist incidents in Asia in 2010
Terrorist incidents in Myanmar
21st century in Yangon
Attacks in Myanmar